CSMA may refer to:

Organizations
 Cathedral of Saint Mary of the Assumption (San Francisco, California), principal Catholic church in the San Francisco Archdiocese, US
 Civil Service Motoring Association, a private motoring organisation in the UK
 Coastal Sound Music Academy, a choral organization in Coquitlam, British Columbia, Canada
 Community School of Music and Arts at Finn Center, an art and music school in Mountain View, California, US
 Congregation of Saint Michael the Archangel, a Catholic religious institute based in Poland

Other uses
 Carrier-sense multiple access, a MAC networking protocol